Robert Hunter (fl. 1748–1780) was a portrait-painter and a native of Ulster. He studied under the elder Pope, and had a considerable practice in Dublin in the middle of the eighteenth century. He modelled his tone of colouring on the painting of old masters.

Biography
Hunter was born in Ulster at an unknown date. By 1748 he was creating portraits. His early work tended to be three quarter portraits with a landscape as a background. His daughter, Marianne, was also an artist. She married the portrait painter John Trotter.

His portraits were excellent likenesses, if not of the first rank in painting. He had an extensive practice until the arrival of Robert Home in 1783, who attracted Hunter's prime business. Hunter contributed frequently to the Dublin Society of Artists after helping to found it. Many of his portraits were engraved in mezzotint, including John, lord Naas (by W. Dickinson), Simon, earl Harcourt, now at Nuneham Park (by E. Fisher), Dr. Samuel Madden (by R. Purcell), John Wesley, painted in Dublin (by James Watson), and others.

The entry from A Dictionary of Irish Artists (1913) reads:

Robert Hunter, the principal portrait painter of his time in Ireland, was a native of Ulster, but of his family and of his early years nothing is known. He studied art under Thomas Pope (q.v.). A portrait by him of Tom Echlin, the noted Dublin wit, was engraved and published by Edward Lyons of Essex Street in 1752. The print was advertised in "Faulkner's Journal," 4 November 1752: "A half-length etched print of the facetious Tom Echlin, from an original painting extremely like." In 1753 Hunter painted a portrait of Sir Charles Burton, Lord Mayor, which was afterwards engraved in mezzotint by J. McArdell; and ten years later, in 1763, the Dublin Society awarded him a premium of ten guineas for a full-length portrait of Lord Taaffe, which was engraved in mezzotint the same year by John Dixon.

He contributed six works, including a "Susanna and the Elders," to the exhibition of the Society of Artists in George's Lane in 1765, and was then living in Bolton Street. In 1766 he was in Stephen Street, and from 1769 at 16 Stafford Street. He regularly contributed to the exhibitions of the Dublin Artists down to 1777, and again, for the last time, in 1800. He was employed by the Corporation of Dublin in 1788 to repair a portrait of Charles II. Hunter was for many years at the head of his profession as a portrait painter and had a large and profitable practice; but after the arrival of Robert Home in 1780 his vogue declined. He held an exhibition and sale of his pictures in 1792. He was living in 1803, but the date of his death has not been ascertained. In Carey's "Memoirs" he is described as "a walking chronicle of everything relative to the Irish artists and arts and was intimate with Madden and Prior." "Sleator's Gazetteer" for 12 March 1763, contains verses on the merits of Hunter as a portrait painter. After lauding his great genius and matchless merits the writer concludes with the lines:

Could Hogarth, Reynolds, view the bold design,
They'd gladly weave their richest wreaths with thine.

Hunter's works are good in colour and evince considerable talent. An excellent example is the "Portrait of a Gentleman" which was formerly at Bellevue, Co. Wicklow, and was sold in 1906, a work which might almost pass as a Reynolds or a Cotes. W. B. S. Taylor ("Fine Arts in Great Britain and Ireland") says "he took excellent likenesses and his practice was extensive; he was truly a gentleman in feeling, and had he practised his art at a time or in a country where the arts were better understood, he would have been very eminent in his profession."

Portrait Paintings 
The following pictures by Hunter are known:

John Bowes, Lord Chancellor. Sold by auction at 17 Pembroke Place, Dublin, 27 April 1847.

Captain L. Brabazon, R.N. [A. Cunningham Robertson, 142 Prince's Road, Liverpool, 1884.]

John, 2nd Earl of Buckinghamshire. Painted in 1780. [Mansion House, Dublin.]

Sir Charles Burton, Lord Mayor in 1753. Engraved in mezzotint by James McArdell.

Henry, 12th Earl and 1st Marquess of Clanricarde, in robes as Knight of St. Patrick. [Countess of Cork, Charles Street, Berkeley Square.] Engraved in stipple by W. Sedgwick.

William Cradock, Dean of St. Patrick's. [Deanery House, St. Patrick's.]

Alexander Crookshank, Justice of the Common Pleas. [Charles Crookshank, Ardglas, Dundrum, Co. Dublin.]

Mrs. Crookshank. [Charles Crookshank, Ardglas, Dundrum, Co. Dublin.]

Arthur Dobbs, M.P. [S. M. Dobbs, Glenariffe Lodge, Co. Antrim.]

Tom Echlin. Etching after a picture. Published by Edward Lyons, Essex Street, in 1752.

Simon, Earl Harcourt, Lord Lieutenant. The head by Hunter, the figure by Doughty; in robes. [Nuneham Courteney, Oxfordshire.]

Simon, Earl Harcourt, Lord Lieutenant. [Belfast Art Gallery.] Engraved in mezzotint by E. Fisher, 1775.

W. Todd Jones. Engraved in stipple by A. McDonald.

George, Earl Macartney, as a young man. [C. G. Macartney, Lissanoure, Co. Antrim.]

Samuel Madden. Engraved in mezzotint by R. Purcell, 1755, and in stipple, bust only, by S. Harding for "European Magazine," 1802.

John Mears, Presbyterian Minister. Engraved in mezzotint, anonymously.

John, Lord Naas. [Earl of Mayo, K.P., Palmerstown.] Engraved in mezzotint by W. Dickinson, 1777.

William, Lord Newbattel, afterwards 5th Marquess of Lothian. Engraved in mezzotint by E. Fisher, 1769, Robertus Hunter Dublinii pinxt.1762.

Sir Edward O'Brien, 2nd Bart. [Earl of Inchiquin.]

Lady O'Brien. [Earl of Inchiquin.]

Richard, Viscount Powerscourt. [Viscount Powerscourt.] Formerly at Santry Court.

Nicholas, Lord Taaffe; full-length in robes. Painted in 1763 and obtained the premium of 10 guineas given by the Dublin Society for the best portrait. Engraved in mezzotint, half-length only, by John Dixon in 1763. A small print by E. Bocquet was published by J. Scott, Strand, London, in 1806.

George, Earl Temple, Lord Lieutenant, afterwards Marquess of Buckingham. [Deanery House, St. Patrick's.] Engraved in mezzotint by William Sadler. A small version of this picture, perhaps done for the engraver, is at Malahide Castle. In "The Dublin Chronicle," January 22–24, 1788, is the following: "The Marquess of Buckingham a few years ago sat for his picture to Hunter. Mr. Cuffe bought it after the departure of that nobleman from the Kingdom. The same artist is now to be employed by the city to make another."

John Wesley. Engraved in mezzotint by James Watson. Done from that much esteemed picture painted at Dublin now in possession of William Weaver. Published by William Weaver, Ross Court, Covent Garden, 1773.

Sigismunda. Ex. Society of Artists, Dublin, 1800.

Portrait Group of Children blowing Soap-bubbles. [Captain Durham Matthews.] Formerly belonged to John Tracey of 13 Heytesbury Street, Dublin.

A Gentleman in blue, Russian costume, standing by a window on which rests an architectural plan. Inscribed R. Hunter Pinxit Dublinii 1771. Christie's, Townshend heirlooms, March, 1904.

A Gentleman, with a dog and gun, seated in a landscape. Signed. La Touche sale, Bellevue, Co. Wicklow, 1906.

References

1780 deaths
People from Ulster
18th-century Irish painters
Irish male painters
Year of birth unknown
Year of birth uncertain